Anton Konstantinovich Manegin (born 12 March 1990) is a Russian former professional tennis player.

Manegin made his only ATP Tour main draw appearance at the 2009 Kremlin Cup, as a wildcard pairing with Teymuraz Gabashvili in the doubles event. In 2011 he represented Russia at the Summer Universiade in Shenzhen, China. During his career he won five doubles titles on the ITF Futures circuit.

His family runs the Timokhovo landfill, east of Moscow, which is considered one of the largest in Europe.

ITF Futures titles

Doubles: (5)

References

External links
 
 

1990 births
Living people
Russian male tennis players
Competitors at the 2011 Summer Universiade